Khayal or Khial Zaman Orakzai (died 14 February 2022) was a Pakistani businessman and politician who was a member of the National Assembly of Pakistan from August 2018 until his death in February 2022.  Previously, he was a member of the National Assembly from June 2013 to May 2018.

Political career
Orakzai joined Pakistan Tehreek-e-Insaf (PTI) in 2011. He was elected to the National Assembly of Pakistan as a candidate of PTI from Constituency NA-16 (Hangu) in 2013 Pakistani general election. He received 24,067 votes and defeated a candidate of Jamiat Ulema-e Islam (F).

He served as Senior Vice President of the PTI with the additional post of the president of the PTI Khyber Pakhtunkhwa.

In 2018, Orakzai was nominated by the PTI to contest 2018 Pakistani Senate election where he was unsuccessful.

He was re-elected to the National Assembly as a candidate of PTI from Constituency NA-33 (Hangu) in 2018 Pakistani general election. He received 28,819 votes and defeated Atiq Ur Rehman, a candidate of Muttahida Majlis-e-Amal (MMA).

Wealth
Orakzai was the Chairman and CEO of Ajman-based Al Kanz Group.  He owned Emaraat hotel in Peshawar and had property business. He had a net worth around 1.45 billion, as of 2021

Personal life and death
He died on 14 February 2022.

References

External links 

 National Assembly profile
 Facebook page

20th-century births
Year of birth missing
2022 deaths
Pakistan Tehreek-e-Insaf politicians
Pakistani MNAs 2013–2018
Pakistani MNAs 2018–2023
Pashtun people
People from Hangu District, Pakistan